Nicholas Schumacher (born July 24, 1985) is an American professional baseball player who is currently a free agent. 

He was drafted by the San Diego Padres in the 28th round of the 2008 MLB Draft out of Wayne State College, where he earned All-American honors in 2008 and was selected as NSIC Pitcher of the Year. He pitched in the Padres system through 2010. His last season there he pitched in 40 games with the Fort Wayne TinCaps and 23 games with the Lake Elsinore Storm and had a combined record of 4–7 with a 5.13 ERA.

After his release from the Padres, Schumacher contacted a former teammate who was playing with the Sioux City Explorers of the American Association of Independent Professional Baseball who convinced the Manager to give him a shot. For the 2011 season, he pitched 148.2 innings for the Explorers, a single season record, finishing second in the AA in strikeouts (123) and third in ERA (3.03). At the end of the season he also played in a few games for the York Revolution in the Atlantic League of Professional Baseball. He returned to Sioux City for 2012 but had a weaker season with a 5–8 record and 5.57 ERA.

Schumacher has signed with York for 2013. And also played for the Spain national baseball team in the 2013 World Baseball Classic.

References

External links

1985 births
Baseball pitchers
Living people
2013 World Baseball Classic players
Arizona League Padres players
Eugene Emeralds players
Fort Wayne TinCaps players
Lake Elsinore Storm players
Sioux City Explorers players
York Revolution players
Wayne State Wildcats baseball players
People from Wayne, Nebraska